The Fortune Global 500, also known as Global 500, is an annual ranking of the top 500 corporations worldwide as measured by revenue.  The list is compiled and published annually by Fortune magazine.

Methodology 
Until 1989, it listed only non-United States industrial corporations under the title "International 500" while the Fortune 500 contained and still contains exclusively United States corporations. In 1990, United States companies were added to compile a truly global list of top industrial corporations as ranked by sales. Since 1995, the list has had its current form, listing also top financial corporations and service providers by revenue.

Several inconsistencies exist in Fortune ranking of cities with the most Fortune 500 headquarters. On June 3, 2011, the Atlanta Business Chronicle stated examples of Fortune including regional headquarters for some cities, excluding regional headquarters for other cities and in some cases excluding headquarters that are physically located inside a city limit.

Geographical distribution 
Since 2001, there has been a significant change in the geographical distribution of the companies in the Global 500 rankings. Most of this growth is accounted for by the rapid increase in the number of Chinese Global 500 companies, of which there were 135 by 2021, increasing from only 10 in 2001. The share of European-based companies also declined, from 158 to 143, over the same period.

Fortune Global 500 of 2022 
The following is the list of top 10 companies in 2022.

Breakdown by country 
, this is the list of the top 10 countries with the highest revenues top 500 companies.

Breakdown by region 
, 26 (5%) of the Fortune Global 500 companies are located outside East Asia, North America, and Europe.

Leadership by sector 
The following are the top-ranked companies in 2022 for each sector.

Fortune Global 500 of 2021 
The following is the list of top 10 companies.

Breakdown by country 
, this is the list of the top 10 countries with the highest revenues top 500 companies.

Breakdown by region 
, just 21 (4%) of the Fortune Global 500 companies are located outside East Asia, North America, and Europe.

Fortune Global 500 list of 2020 
The following is the list of top 10 companies.

Breakdown by country 
, this is the list of the top 10 countries with the highest earning top 500 companies.

‡ The Global 500 includes Unilever under the heading "Britain/Netherlands", as the company is counted in the tally for both countries.

Leadership by sector 
The following are the top-ranked companies in 2020 for each sector.

Breakdown by region 
, just 24 (5%) of the Fortune Global 500 companies are located outside East Asia, North America, and Europe.

Fortune Global 500 list of 2019 
The following is the list of top 10 companies.

Breakdown by country 
, this is the list of the top 10 countries with the most Global 500 companies.

‡ The Global 500 includes Unilever & Royal Dutch Shell under the heading "Britain/Netherlands", as the company is counted in the tally for both countries.

Leadership by sector
The following are the top-ranked companies in 2019 for each sector.

Fortune Global 500 list of 2018 
The following is the list of top 10 companies.

Breakdown by country 
, this is the list of the top 10 countries with the most Global 500 companies.

† The Global 500 includes Unilever under the heading "Britain/Netherlands", as the company is counted in the tally for both countries.

As shown in the table above, 436 (87.2%) of the Global 500 are represented by only 10 countries: two in North America (Canada and United States), five in Western Europe (France, Germany, Netherlands, Switzerland and the United Kingdom) and three in East Asia (China, Japan and South Korea). Moreover, the top six (United States, China, Japan, Germany, France and the United Kingdom) are the world's largest economies as estimated by the IMF (List of countries by GDP (nominal)). Among the Global 500, 379 companies (75.8%) are from these six countries.

Leadership by sector
The following are the top-ranked companies in 2018 for each sector.

Breakdown by industry

The following are the top-ranked companies in 2018 for each industry.

Most profitable

The following is the global 500 list sorted by profits.

Fortune Global 500 list of 2017 
The following is the list of top 10 companies.

† Fortune had previously listed Shell as a British/Dutch company, but as of the 2016 listing it is listed as Dutch.

Breakdown by country 
, this is the list of the top 10 countries with the most Global 500 companies.

† The Global 500 includes Unilever under the heading "Britain/Netherlands", as the company is counted in the tally for both countries.

As can be seen from the table above, 425 (85.0%) of the Global 500 are represented by only 10 countries: two in North America (Canada and United States), five in Western Europe (France, Germany, Netherlands, Switzerland, and the United Kingdom) and three in East Asia (China, Japan and South Korea). Moreover, the top six (United States, China, Japan, France, Germany, and the United Kingdom) are some of the world's largest economies as estimated by the IMF (List of countries by GDP (nominal)). Among the Fortune Global 500, 371 companies (74.2%) are from these six countries.

Leadership by sector
The top-ranked companies in each sector are as follows:

See also 

 40 Under 40
 Fortune India 500
 Forbes Global 2000
 Fortune 500
 Fortune 1000
 List of largest companies by revenue
 List of largest employers
 List of public corporations by market capitalization

References

External links 
 Fortune.com: full Fortune Global 500 listings

Global 500
Lists of companies by revenue
Corporation-related lists
International rankings
Top lists
Annual magazine issues